Palaeocyttus is an extinct genus of prehistoric bony fish that lived during the Cenomanian.

See also

 Prehistoric fish
 List of prehistoric bony fish

References

Late Cretaceous fish